Yury Napso (born 17 April 1973, Tuapse, Krasnodar Krai) is a Russian political figure and a deputy of the 5th, 6th, 7th, and 8th State Dumas.
 
After graduating from the Adyghe State University in 2000, Napso was appointed CEO of Rosnefteresurs CJSC. He also worked as an advisor to the deputy of the State Duma. On December 2, 2007, he was elected deputy of the 5th State Duma. In 2011, 2017, and 2021, he was re-elected deputy of the 6th, 7th, and 8th State Dumas, respectively.
 
Following the results of 2020, Napso became the wealthiest deputy of the State Duma from the Krasnodar Krai constituency, with an income of 21,4 mln rubles.

References
 

 

1973 births
Living people
Liberal Democratic Party of Russia politicians
21st-century Russian politicians
Eighth convocation members of the State Duma (Russian Federation)
Seventh convocation members of the State Duma (Russian Federation)
Sixth convocation members of the State Duma (Russian Federation)
Fifth convocation members of the State Duma (Russian Federation)
People from Tuapse